Cavanagh or Cavanaugh is a surname.

Cavanagh or Cavanaugh may also refer to:

Places
 Cavanagh (townland), County Cavan, Ireland
 Cavanagh, Edmonton, Canada, a neighbourhood
 Cavanaugh Flight Museum, Addison, Texas, US
 Cavanagh, Córdoba, a municipality in Marcos Juárez Department, Córdoba Province, Argentina

Entertainment
 The Cavanaughs (TV series) 
 The Cavanaughs (web series)

See also
 Kavanagh (disambiguation)